Miriam Young (died September 12, 1974) was an American writer best known for children's books. She also wrote Mother Wore Tights, a memoir about growing up in a vaudeville family, which was adapted as the 1947 film of the same name, a "Hollywood supermusical".

Young was born in 1911 or 1912, her New York Times obituary implies. Other sources give year of birth 1913. The Library of Congress gives date February 26, 1913.

Selected works
 Mother Wore Tights (1944)
 The Dollar Horse (1961)
 The Secret of Stone House Farm (1963)
 Miss Suzy (1964)
 Jellybeans for Breakfast (1968)
 A Witch's Garden (1973)

References

 "Miriam Young, 62, writer, is dead". The New York Times Biographical Service. New York Times & Arno Press. 1974. Volume 5. Page 1355. Google Books. – Originally published in the newspaper, September 13, 1974, p. 40. See above.
Commire, Anne (ed). "Miriam Young (1913–1974)" in Something About the Author. Gale Research. Detroit, Michigan. 1975. Volume 7.
Reginald, Menville and Burgess. "Miriam Young" in Science Fiction and Fantasy Literature. 1979. Reprinted by Wildside Press. 2010. Volume 2 (Contemporary Science Fiction Authors II). Page 1137.

External links

 

American children's writers
1910s births
1974 deaths
20th-century American writers
20th-century American women writers